Gosal  is a village in Kapurthala district of Punjab State, India. The village is administrated by a Sarpanch who is an elected representative of village as per the constitution of India and Panchayati raj (India).

Demography 
According to the report published by Census India in 2011, Gosal has total number of 96 houses and a population of 451 of which 240 are males and 211 are females. The literacy rate of Gosal is 79.86%, higher than state average of 75.84%.  The population of children under the age of 6 years is 34 which is 7.54% of the total population of Gosal, and the child sex ratio is approximately 700, lower than the state average of 846.

Population data

Air travel connectivity 
The closest airport to the village is Sri Guru Ram Dass Jee International Airport.

Villages in Kapurthala

References

External links
  Villages in Kapurthala
 Kapurthala Villages List

Villages in Kapurthala district